Katannilik Territorial Park Reserve ("the place of waterfalls") is a territorial park in the Qikiqtaaluk Region of Nunavut, Canada. The Soper River, part of the Canadian Heritage Rivers System, flows through the park.

References

External links
 Nunavut Parks - Katannilik

Parks in Qikiqtaaluk Region
Protected areas established in 1993
Territorial parks of Nunavut